Urodacus lowei is a species of scorpion in the Urodacidae family. It is endemic to Australia, and was first described in 1977 by L. E. Koch.

Description
The holotype is 120 mm in length. Colouration is light yellowish-brown to reddish-brown.

Distribution and habitat
The species occurs in north-western Western Australia.

References

 

 
lowei
Scorpions of Australia
Endemic fauna of Australia
Fauna of Western Australia
Animals described in 1977